Will You Merry Me? is a television comedy Christmas film starring Wendie Malick and Cynthia Stevenson. It was filmed in 2007/2008, and was first aired on Lifetime in 2008.

Plot 

The Fines must survive Christmas with the Kringles. Rebecca, Jewish, and her fiancé Henry, Christian, must get to know their in-laws, put up with fighting parents, and survey their family's traditions as they prepare to share a life together.

Cast 

 Wendie Malick as Suzie Fine
 Cynthia Stevenson as Marilyn Kringle
 Vikki Krinsky as Rebecca Fine
 Tommy Lioutas as Henry Kringle
 David Eisner as Marvin Fine
 Patrick McKenna as Hank Kringle
 Reagan Pasternak as Kristy Easterbrook
 Martin Doyle as Tom Schultz

See also
 List of Christmas films

2008 television films
2008 films
American Christmas comedy films
Christian and Jewish interfaith dialogue
Christmas television films
Lifetime (TV network) films
2000s Christmas comedy films
2000s American films